The Low Energy Anti-Proton Ring (LEAR) was a particle accelerator at CERN which operated from 1982 until 1996. The ring was designed to decelerate and store antiprotons, to study the properties of antimatter and to create atoms of antihydrogen.  Antiprotons for the ring were created by the CERN Proton Synchrotron via the Antiproton Collector and the Antiproton Accumulator. The creation of at least 9 atoms of antihydrogen were confirmed by the PS210 experiment in 1995.

In 1996, LEAR was converted into the Low Energy Ion Ring, which has since been used in the lead ion injection process for the Large Hadron Collider. Low energy antiproton research continues at CERN using the Antiproton Decelerator. It was built as a successor for LEAR and started operation in 2000.

References 

CERN accelerators
Particle accelerators
CERN
CERN facilities
Particle physics facilities